SLC Twenty20 Tournament was a Twenty20 domestic cricket competition in Sri Lanka held by Sri Lanka Cricket. It was conducted from 2004 to 2007 and was held between the clubs in Sri Lanka. From 2008, SLC Super Provincial Twenty20 became the premier domestic Twenty20 competition in Sri Lanka.

Tournament history

2004 season

The 2004 Twenty20 Tournament was held between 17 August and 3 September 2004 in Colombo.

Winner: Chilaw Marians Runner-up: Colts

2005–06 season
The 2005–06 Twenty20 Tournament was held between 8 October and 5 November 2005.

Winner : SSC Runner-up : Chilaw Marians

2006–07 season 
The 2006–07 Twenty20 Tournament was held between 28 February and 4 March 2007.

Winner : Ragama Runner-up : Saracens Sports Club

2007-08 season

The 2007-08 Inter-Provincial Twenty20 was held between 17 April and 1 May 2008.

Winner : Wayamba Runner-up : Ruhuna

2014-15 SLC Twenty20 Tournament

Winner : Badureliya Cricket Club Runner-up : Sinhalese Sports Club

2015-16 season

Winner : Sri Lanka Army Runner-up : Tamil Union

2017-18 season

The 2007-08 Inter-Provincial Twenty20 was held between 17 April and 1 May 2008.

Winner : Nondescripts Cricket Club Runner-up : Colombo Cricket Club

2018-19 season

Winner : Moors Sports Club Runner-up : Nondescripts Cricket Club

2019-20 season 

Winner : Colombo Cricket Club Runner-up : Chilaw Marians Cricket Club

2019-20 season 

Winner : Sinhalese Sports Club

Runner-up : Sri Lanka Army Sports Club

2021 season 

Winner : SLC Greys

Runner-up : SLC Reds

2022 season 

Winner : SLC Reds

Runner-up : SLC Blues

References

External links
2004 Tournament Page – Cricinfo
2005–06 Tournament Page – Cricinfo
2006–07 Tournament Page – Cricinfo

Sri Lankan domestic cricket competitions
2004 establishments in Sri Lanka
Twenty20 cricket leagues